Klah Tso (mid-19th – early 20th century) was a Navajo painter. He is considered a pioneer Navajo easel painter.

Background
Klah Tso was also known as Big Lefthanded, Big Lefthanded Chou, or Old Hostin Claw. He should not be confused with Hastiin Klah, the Navajo weaver, or Choh, the Navajo graphic artist. He lived near Tuba City, Arizona, or possibly Indian Wells. He was a traditional singer.

Artwork
From around 1902 to 1915, Klah Tso created equestrian and ceremonial paintings using natural pigments applied with a stick. The Navajo agent and trader, Matthew M. Murphy collected 29 of Klah Tso's drypaintings, which were believed to be created between 1905 and 1912.

Klah Tso also adopted a variety of Western materials such as oil, gouache, tempera, and colored pencil. He painted representational, narrative works on brown cotton cloth.

Several of Klah Tso's works are in the collections of the National Anthropological Archives. The Ride portrays a line of Navajo riders following a man with a ceremonial staff. There is no background but the horses are kicking up a cloud of dust on the tan-dyed cotton cloth background. While some of his works are secular in subject matter, many portray Navajo ceremonies.

Jeanne O. Snodgrass wrote that he created, "one of the loveliest known early American Indian paintings" to be seen by non-Natives. His work is also in the Museum of Northern Arizona, Katherine Harvey Collection in Flagstaff, Arizona.

See also

List of Native American artists
Visual arts by indigenous peoples of the Americas

Notes

References
 Lester, Patrick D. The Biographical Directory of Native American Painters. Norman: University of Oklahoma Press, 1995. .
Wyman, Leland Clifton. Sandpaintings of the Navaho Shootingway and the Walcott Collection. Washington, DC: Smithsonian Institution Press, 1970.

Further reading
 Wyman, Leland Clifton. "Big Lefthanded, Pioneer Navajo Artist." Plateau. Number 40, Summer 1967: 1-13.

External links
Images of Klah Tso's work at the National Anthropological Archives

Navajo painters
19th-century births
People from Coconino County, Arizona
Year of birth missing
Year of death missing